APEC Peru 2016 was the XXVIII year-long hosting of Asia-Pacific Economic Cooperation (APEC) meetings in Peru, which was culminate with the XXIV APEC Economic Leaders' Meeting in 19–20 November 2016 in Lima. It marked the second time Peru played host to the APEC, previously hosting in 2008.

Agenda
Four priority areas were laid out as topics to be discussed for the 2016 APEC summit. These are Human Capital Development, Upgrading SMEs, Regional Food Market, and Regional Economic Integration Agenda. These subjects were chosen to build upon on the discussions from the previous APEC summit in the Philippines.

Branding

On 29 January 2016, the Peruvian President Ollanta Humala said that the theme of the APEC Summit is "Quality Growth and Human Development". The architecture of the ancient city of Caral serves as the inspiration for the official logo of the APEC summit.

Preparations
On 6 September 2012, then Peruvian Foreign Minister Rafael Roncagliolo announced that Peru will host the APEC Summit on 2016.

The launch ceremony for APEC Peru 2016 was made at the Government Palace in Lima which was led by President Ollanta Humala.

A temporary Multisectoral Working Group (High-Level Extraordinary Commission) was established to aid in the organization of events for the APEC Summit, chaired by Mercedes Aráoz.

Events

Economic Leaders' Meeting
The Economic Leaders' Meeting was held from 19 to 20 November 2016 at the Lima Convention Center in Lima.

Attendees

Prior to the Economic Leaders' Meeting, South Korean President Park Geun-hye and Thai Prime Minister Prayuth Chan-ocha decided not to attend in the occasion citing their attendance to address their own domestic issues such as the North Korean nuclear program, as well the 2016 South Korean political scandal and the death and mourning of King Bhumibol Adulyadej, respectively. Park was represented by Prime Minister Hwang Kyo-ahn, while Chan-ocha was represented by his Deputy Prime Minister Prajin Juntong. Indonesian President Joko Widodo also did not attend the summit for the second time consecutively and was again replaced by Vice President Jusuf Kalla; the two had agreed that Widodo would only attend larger global scale conferences while Kalla would attend smaller regional scale conferences like APEC.

This was the first APEC meeting for Vietnamese President Trần Đại Quang, Philippine President Rodrigo Duterte and the host, Peruvian President Pedro Pablo Kuczynski since their inaugurations on 2 April 2016, 30 June 2016 and 28 July 2016, respectively.

It was also the last APEC meeting for United States President Barack Obama (who stepped down on 20 January 2017 following the 2016 U.S. presidential election and the inauguration of Donald Trump), as well as Hong Kong Chief Executive CY Leung (who stepped down on 1 July 2017 following the 2017 Hong Kong election) and New Zealand Prime Minister John Key (who stepped down on 12 December 2016 following his resignation).

Colombian President Juan Manuel Santos was in attendance as invited guest. The Pacific Alliance member states: Peru, Chile, Mexico, and Colombia will hold a separate summit with APEC leaders.

Sideline and bilateral meetings
Aside from the Economic Leaders' Meeting itself, some leaders met with each other in separate bilateral meetings within the week of the leaders' meet. The meeting's host, Peruvian President Pedro Kuczynski, also hosted state visits at the Government Palace for Japanese Prime Minister Shinzō Abe and Chinese President Xi Jinping.

Russian President Vladimir Putin had bilateral meetings with the leaders from China, Japan, Philippines, and Vietnam. He also held bilateral meeting with Kuczynski. South Korean Prime Minister also held a bilateral meeting with Kuczynski.

U.S. President Barack Obama held a bilateral meeting with Australian Prime Minister Malcolm Turnbull, Canadian Prime Minister Justin Trudeau and Chinese President Xi Jinping.

On a sideline meeting about the Trans-Pacific Partnership (TTP), President Barack Obama briefed leaders of signatory states of the partnership about the status of the treaty, and its support by the US Congress and businessmen. A consensus was reach among the signatory states that the TTP must be realized and will only look for an alternative if the United States later decides not to take part of it. There were concerns over the fate of the treaty due to incoming U.S. President Donald Trump's opposition to the deal. It is reported that if either Japan or the United States back out the treaty won't push through. New Zealand Prime Minister John Key proposed making "cosmetic changes" to make the deal more acceptable to Trump.

References

External links

2016 conferences
2016 in economics
2016 in international relations
2016 in Peru
21st-century diplomatic conferences (Asia-Pacific)
2016
Diplomatic conferences in Peru
Economy of Peru
November 2016 events in South America